"Hurt Anymore" is a song by Australian recording artists Samantha Jade and Cyrus, released as a single on 4 November 2016 through Sony Music Australia, The music video premiered on VEVO on November 29, 2016.

Background and recording
"Hurt Anymore" was written and recorded in London, with Jade describing the song as "a sad song — it's about when you know you're not in love anymore and the relationship is ruining you so it's time to get out". The single's release was first announced on Jade's Facebook page on 28 October 2016 and was released on 4 November.

Live performances
Jade and Cyrus performed the song live on the eighth season of The X Factor Australia on 14 November 2016.

They performed the song across New South Wales and Queensland throughout November.

Charts

Release history

References

2016 songs
2016 singles
Samantha Jade songs
Songs written by Samantha Jade
Songs written by Iain James
Songs written by Jez Ashurst
Sony Music Australia singles